The following is a list of Burmese Chinese (Burmese of Chinese descent) having a Wikipedia page and are grouped by their area of notability.

Politicians and Government
 San Yu (1918-1996), President of Burma, and Commander in Chief of the Tatmadaw
 Ne Win (1910-2002), Prime Minister of Burma (1958-1960), and military dictator of the Socialist Republic of the Union of Burma period (1962-1988)
 Aung Gyi 陈旺枝 (Hokkien) (1919–2012), Brigadier General, Vice-Chief of General Staff of Burmese Army, Minister of Trade and Industry, and Former Chairman of the National League for Democracy Party
 Khin Nyunt (Hakka) (born 1939), Prime Minister and Chief of Intelligence of Myanmar
Kyaw Myint, Minister of Health and Rector of University of Medicine 1
 Kyi Maung (Teochew) (1920–2004), Colonel, Former Commander of Southwest Military Command of Burmese Army and Former Vice-chairman of the National League for Democracy Party
 Ohn Myint Thakin (1918–2010), Journalist and Anti-colonialist
 Pheung Kya-shin 彭家声 (Yunnanese) (born 1931), Leader of Kokang Special Region and Commander-in-Chief of Myanmar National Democratic Alliance Army
 Tan Yu Sai 陈裕才, Colonel, Former Vice-Commissioner of General of People's Police, and Minister of Trade of Myanmar
 Olive Yang, opium warlord and sister of the saopha (chief) of Kokang

Businesspeople 
 Aik Htun 李松枝 (born 1948), Businessman and Banker
 Aw Boon Haw 胡文虎 (1882–1954) (Hakka), Burmese Chinese Entrepreneur and Philanthropist best known for introducing Tiger Balm
 Aw Boon Par 胡文豹 (1888–1944) (Hakka), Burmese Chinese Entrepreneur and Philanthropist
 Aw Chu Kin 胡子钦 (?–1908) (Hakka), Burmese Chinese Herbalist and Inventor of Tiger Balm
 Chan Mah Phee 曾广庇 (Hokkien), Businessman, Investor and Philanthropist
 Htun Myint Naing 罗平忠 (born 1958) (Kokang), Business Tycoon
 Kyaw Myint, Founder of Myanmar May Flower Bank and one of the Richest Men in Myanmar
 Kyaw Win, Chairman of Sky Net and Shwe Than Lwin Company
 Lim Chin Tsong 林振宗 (1867–1923) (Hokkien), First Overseas Chinese Tycoon in Myanmar
 Peter Chou Win Than 周永明 (Yunnanese) (born 1956), Former CEO, President and Co-founder of HTC
 Serge Pun Theim Wai 潘继泽 (born 1953), Businessman and Chairman of the Serge Pun & Associates Group (SPA Group)
 Zhang Xin 张欣 (born 1965), Chinese billionaire, co-founder and CEO of SOHO China
 U Htay Myint, Yuzana Trading

Other personalities
 Bruce Le 黄建龙 (born 1950), Martial Artist, Actor and Director
 Chen Yi-sein Yi Sein 陈孺性 (1924–2005), Historian and one of the first members of the Burma Historical Commission
 Edward Michael Law-Yone (1911–1980), Burmese Journalist and Founder of The Nation, Burma's most influential English language newspaper during the time
 Khun Sa 张奇夫 (1934–2007)(Kokang), Famous Drug Lord, and Commander-in-Chief of the Mong Tai Army and the Shan United Revolutionary Army
 Lo Hsing Han 罗星汉 (1935–2013) (Kokang), Drug Lord and Business Tycoon
 Loletta Chu 朱玲玲 (born 1958) (Cantonese), 1977 Miss Hong Kong Pageant
 Maung Htin Htin Fatt (1909–2006), Writer and Journalist
 Minfong Ho (born 1951), Chinese-American Writer
 Moe Set Wine (born 1988) (Yunnanese), Miss Universe Myanmar 2013
 Alice Ong (born 1994), actress
 Ngwe Gaing, Alinga Kyawzwa Award-Winning painter
 Sayadaw U Tejaniya (born 1962), Theravadin Buddhist monk and meditation teacher at Shwe Oo Min Dhamma Sukha Forest Center
 Taw Sein Ko 杜成诰 (1864–1930) (Hokkien), First Recorded Archaeologist in Myanmar and Assistant Secretary to the Government of British Burma
 Thaw Kaung (born 1937) (Hokkien), Historian

References 

Burmese people of Chinese descent
Chinese
Chinese